The Rumor II Cabinet was the 24th cabinet of the Italian Republic. It held office from 5 August 1969 until 27 March 1970, for a total of 234 days, or 7 months and 22 days.

Composition

|}

References

Italian governments
1969 establishments in Italy
1970 disestablishments in Italy
Cabinets established in 1969
Cabinets disestablished in 1970